Tomohiro Araya (born October 22, 1994) is a taijiquan athlete from Japan.

Career 
Tomohiro made his international debut at the 2015 World Wushu Championships where he was a double silver medalist. This qualified him for the 2016 Taolu World Cup where he won a gold medal in taijijian and a bronze medal in taijiquan. A year later, he was the world champion in taijijian and a bronze medalist in taijiquan at the 2017 World Wushu Championships. At the 2018 Asian Games, he won the silver medal in men's taijiquan, earning the only medal for Japan in wushu at the games.

See also 

 List of Asian Games medalists in wushu

References

External links 

 Tormohiro Araya on Instagram
 Profile at the Japanese Olympic Committee

1994 births
Living people
Japanese wushu practitioners
Wushu practitioners at the 2018 Asian Games
Medalists at the 2018 Asian Games
Asian Games medalists in wushu
Asian Games silver medalists for Japan
Place of birth missing (living people)